Sir Mark Brian Pepys  (born 18 September 1944) is a South African-born British academic of medicine. He was until 2011 Professor of Medicine at University College London and Head of Medicine at the Hampstead Campus and the Royal Free Hospital.

Education
Pepys was born in Cape Town, South Africa, the son of physician Jack Pepys   and Rhoda Gertrude Pepys (née Kussel). He moved to the UK in 1948. He finished his early education at the University of Cambridge, and then qualified as a medical doctor at University College London Medical School. He then returned to  Cambridge where he was awarded a PhD in Immunology in 1973.

Awards and honours
Pepys won the GlaxoSmithKline Prize in 2007 "for his excellent work as a clinical scientist who has identified specific proteins as new therapeutic targets and developed novel drugs with potential use in amyloidosis, Alzheimer's disease and cardiovascular disease". In 1998, Pepys was elected a Fellow of the Royal Society (FRS). His nomination reads: 

In 1999, he became director of the University College London Centre for Amyloidosis and Acute Phase Proteins.

Mark Pepys has recently won the 2008 Ernst Chain Prize for his work on amyloid diseases, established by Imperial College London in recognition of leaders in their fields.

Pepys was knighted in the 2012 New Year Honours for services to biomedicine.

See also
SAP scan

References 

1944 births
Living people
People from Cape Town
South African scientists
Fellows of the Royal Society
Fellows of Trinity College, Cambridge
Knights Bachelor
Fellows of the Royal College of Physicians of Edinburgh
Fellows of the Academy of Medical Sciences (United Kingdom)
Fellows of the Royal College of Pathologists